Jufelhurst School, also known as Jufelhurst Government School, is a school located in Karachi, Pakistan. It was founded by Sybil D'Abreo in 1931.

The school building is spread on approximately an acre of land and has two buildings, a playground, and a residence for the principal of the school.

The building of Jufelhurst School is nestled between almond trees and new high-rise buildings in the narrow streets of Cincinnatus Town (now part of Garden East), Soldier Bazaar.

History
The school was founded by Sybil D'Abreo, a Goan woman, in 1931 in her home located in Cincinnatus Town. Sybil D'Abreo named the school after her parents, Julia and Felix, and coined a word Jufel based on their name's initial letters.

In 1974, the school was nationalized by the Government of Pakistan.

The medium of instruction was switched to Urdu under the Zia administration.

As of 2013, around 1,700 students were studying at the school.

References

Schools in Karachi
1930s establishments in British India